Richardo Brangman (born 25 August 1980) is a Bermudian cricketer. Brangman is a right-handed batsman who plays as a wicket-keeper.

In January 2008, Bermuda were again invited to part in the 2008 Stanford 20/20, where Brangman made a single Twenty20 appearance against Guyana in the first round. Bermuda made 62/9 from their twenty overs, during which Brangman was dismissed for a duck by Lennox Cush. In Guyana's successful chase, Brangman took a single catch from behind the stumps, catching Travis Dowlin for 4 runs off the bowling of Traddie Simpson.

Brangman also plays football for Devonshire Cougars, playing as a goalkeeper.

References

External links
Ricardo Brangman at ESPNcricinfo
Ricardo Brangman at CricketArchive

1980 births
Living people
Association football goalkeepers
Bermudian cricketers
Bermudian footballers
Wicket-keepers